Colombia did not send a team to the 1900 Summer Olympics in Paris, France.  However, the French-born Colombian Francisco Henríquez de Zubiría represented France in the mixed team Tug of war at the 1900 Summer Olympics tournament and won a silver medal.

Medalist - member of Mixed team

References

Nations at the 1900 Summer Olympics